The GoodPlanet Foundation is a non-governmental organization founded by Yann Arthus-Bertrand in 2005, supporting ecology and sustainable development.

Activities 
The GoodPlanet Foundation is mainly concerned with the distribution of pedagogic documents and the organization of events for raising awareness of the importance of sustainable development such as the ecology film-festival "GoodPlanet" in Rio de Janeiro, the exhibition "6 billion others", conferences and events for enterprises.

It creates posters for educational institutions about topics such as the Bee Movie development, bio-diversity, and forests. It publishes a catalog of consumer products it considers environmentally responsible.

It also organizes its activities through websites. It leads actioncarbone.org, a stock promotion program aimed at reducing emissions of greenhouse gases, which includes a service offsetting CO emissions. It also manages the site, goodplanet.info, established in 2009, which is an educational website aimed at informing the public about sustainable development. It finances school projects and environment-conservation projects.

In 2009, the mayor of Bordeaux, Alain Juppé, was elected Vice-President of GoodPlanet. It handled the international distribution of Human which premiered on 12 September 2015.

In 2011, the GoodPlanet foundation was quoted in a parliamentary information report by deputies Geneviève Gaillard and Jean-Marie Sermier, asking for more transparency from environmental associations. They question in particular the fact that the foundation supported Qatar's candidacy for the organization of the 2022 FIFA World Cup.

See also
 Corporate social responsibility
 Philanthropy

References

Further reading 
 Le Catalogue GoodPlanet.org, Éditions de La Martinière, 300 pages.

External links 
 Official Website

Environmental organizations based in France
Foundations based in France
Environmental organizations established in 2005
2005 establishments in France